Darian Roy Townsend (born 28 August 1984) is a competition swimmer and Olympic gold medalist who competed for South Africa.  He became a U.S. citizen during the summer of 2014, and has subsequently represented the United States in international events.

He was born in Durban, KwaZulu-Natal, South Africa.

Townsend was a member of the South African men's 4×100 metre freestyle relay team that won gold and broke the world record at the 2004 Summer Olympics in Athens, Greece.

Townsend attended the University of Arizona, where he swam for the Arizona Wildcats swimming and diving team in 2007 and 2008.  He previously attended the University of Florida and competed for the Florida Gators swimming and diving team in 2005 and 2006.

See also 

 List of Commonwealth Games medallists in swimming (men)
 List of University of Florida Olympians
 List of Olympic medalists in swimming (men)
 World record progression 200 metres individual medley
 World record progression 4 × 100 metres freestyle relay

References

External links 

 

1984 births
Living people
Alumni of Maritzburg College
Arizona Wildcats men's swimmers
Commonwealth Games bronze medallists for South Africa
Florida Gators men's swimmers
World record setters in swimming
South African male freestyle swimmers
Male medley swimmers
Medalists at the 2004 Summer Olympics
Olympic gold medalists for South Africa
Olympic swimmers of South Africa
People from Pinetown
South African male swimmers
South African people of British descent
Swimmers at the 2004 Summer Olympics
Swimmers at the 2006 Commonwealth Games
Swimmers at the 2008 Summer Olympics
Swimmers at the 2010 Commonwealth Games
Swimmers at the 2012 Summer Olympics
White South African people
Swimmers at the 2015 Pan American Games
Pan American Games silver medalists for the United States
Olympic gold medalists in swimming
Commonwealth Games medallists in swimming
African Games gold medalists for South Africa
African Games medalists in swimming
Pan American Games medalists in swimming
African Games silver medalists for South Africa
African Games bronze medalists for South Africa
Competitors at the 2007 All-Africa Games
Competitors at the 2011 All-Africa Games
Medalists at the 2015 Pan American Games
Medallists at the 2010 Commonwealth Games